Bob Kerr (born 1951) is an author, illustrator and artist based in Wellington, New Zealand. He writes and illustrates children’s books and has won several awards for his work. He lives and works in Wellington, New Zealand.

Biography 
Bob Kerr was born in 1951 in Wellington, New Zealand. He grew up in Tokoroa and graduated with a Diploma of Fine Arts (Hons) in 1974 from the University of Auckland. In 1973 he was an editor of Craccum (the Auckland University Students' Association weekly magazine) along with collaborator Stephen Ballantyne, with whom he went on to create Terry and the Gunrunners, which has been adapted for television twice. The first series was released in 1985 and is hosted in full on NZ On Screen. The 2016 series was "a darker, edgier, more mature reboot of the show". The comic was re-issued in 2015.

He was a judge of the New Zealand Post Children's Book Awards in 2005 and 2012; in 2005 he was the convener of the panel.

Many of his stories have appeared in the New Zealand School Journal. He was included in the book A Nest of Singing Birds: 100 Years of the New Zealand School Journal.

Painting
Kerr's paintings are often based on historical events. His work has featured the stories of conscientious objectors, scientists, the New Zealand Wars, the 1916 police invasion of Maungapohatu, a New Zealand soldier's experiences during the Gallipoli campaign, and the Waihi miners' strike of 1912. His best-known work appears on the cover of Michael King's book The Penguin History of New Zealand (2003).

Select bibliography
 Lucy’s Big Plan, text by Christine Harris (Collins 1977).
 Lucy Loops the Loop, text by Oz Kraus (Collins 1979)
 Terry and the Gunrunners, text by Stephen Ballantyne (Collins 1982)
 Terry and the Yodelling Bull, text by Stephen Ballantyne (Finlayson Hill 1986)
 Terry and the Last Moa, text by Stephen Ballantyne (Hodder & Stoughton 1990)
 For a Living, co-edited with Linda Mitchell (Working Life Publications 1991)
 The Optimist (Mallinson Rendel 1992)
 The Day of the Rain, text by Joy Cowley (Mallinson Rendel 1993)
 The Day of the Snow, text by Joy Cowley (Mallinson Rendel 1994)
 The Paper War (Mallinson Rendel 1994)
 Mechanical Harry (Mallinson Rendel 1996)
 Strange Tales from the Mall (Mallinson Rendel 1998)
 Mechanical Harry and the Flying Bicycle (Mallinson Rendel 1999)
 After the War (Mallinson Rendel 2000)
 Field punishment No.1., text by David Grant with paintings by Bob Kerr (Steele Roberts, 2008)
 Waiheathens. Voices from a Mining Town, text by Mark Derby with paintings by Bob Kerr (Atuanui Press, 2013)
 Best Mates, text by Philippa Werry (New Holland Publishers, 2014)
 Changing Times, The Story of a New Zealand Town and its Newspaper (Potton and Burton 2015)

Awards and Prizes
 1993 AIM Children’s Book Awards Best First Book for The Optimist.
 1993 AIM Children’s Book Awards Junior Fiction Shortlist for The Optimist.
 1994 AIM Children’s Book Awards Picture Book Shortlist for The Day of the Rain.
 1997 New Zealand Post Children’s Book Awards Children’s Choice Winner for Mechanical Harry.
 1997 New Zealand Post Children’s Book Awards Picture Book Shortlist for Mechanical Harry.
 1999 New Zealand Post Children’s Book Awards Junior Fiction Shortlist for Strange Tales from the Mall.
 2000 Storylines Notable Book Awards Picture Books List for Mechanical Harry and the Flying Bicycle.
 2001 Russell Clark Award Winner for After the War.
 2001 Esther Glen Award Shortlist for After the War.
 2001 New Zealand Post Children’s Book Awards Picture Book Shortlist for After the War.
 2001 PANZ Book Design Awards Best Use of Illustration Winner for After the War.
 2001 Storylines Notable Book Awards Picture Books List for After the War.
 2016 Storylines Notable Book Award (Picture Book) for Changing Times: The Story of a New Zealand Town and its Newspaper.
 2016 New Zealand Book Awards for Children and Young Adults finalist for the Elsie Locke Non-Fiction Award for Changing Times.
 2016 New Zealand Book Awards for Children and Young Adults finalist for the Russell Clark Award for Illustration for Changing Times.

References

External links
Website

1951 births
New Zealand male novelists
University of Auckland alumni
Elam Art School alumni
20th-century New Zealand novelists
21st-century New Zealand novelists
20th-century New Zealand male writers
New Zealand children's writers
New Zealand children's book illustrators
New Zealand illustrators
New Zealand comics artists
20th-century New Zealand painters
20th-century New Zealand male artists
Living people